Hnyla Lypa (Gnilaya Lipa) is a river in Ukraine, a tributary of the Dniester river. 

Hnyla Lypa may also refer to:
, right tributary of Zolota Lypa, Ukraine
 by Hnyla Lypa (Styr tributary), Volyn Oblast, Ukraine

See also

Battle of Gnila Lipa